Wynand Olivier (born 11 June 1983) is a South African professional rugby union player. He currently plays for Worcester Warriors in the English Aviva Premiership competition. His usual position is at centre.

Career
Olivier made his provincial rugby debut for the Blue Bulls in the Currie Cup in a match against Boland in 2003. He made his debut in the Super 12 (now Super Rugby) competition in 2005, playing for the Bulls in a game against the Otago-based Highlanders. He was included in Jake White's 2006 Springboks 45 man training squad. Olivier made his test debut in the first test against Scotland in Durban in 2006 and was included in the Bok starting lineup for the tests against Scotland in Port Elizabeth and France in Cape Town. He was selected to tour with the Springboks as they started their Tri Nations quest in 2006.

Olivier has since further improved on his form and was an integral part of the Bulls' championship winning team proving to be Springbok material. Despite his match-winning qualities, he was second to Springbok veteran Adrian Jacobs in terms of consideration for the position of replacement center for the Springboks.

In 2013, it was announced that he will leave the Bulls to join French Top 14 side Montpellier.

In 2015, it was announced that he will leave Montpellier to join English Aviva Premiership side Worcester Warriors.

Education
Olivier attended Afrikaanse Hoër Seunskool (Afrikaans High School for Boys, also known as Affies), a public school located in Pretoria. He attended alongside Bulls teammates Derick Kuun, Pierre Spies, Jacques-Louis Potgieter and Springboks scrumhalf Fourie du Preez, Stormers lock Adriaan Fondse, former Stade Français lock Cliff Milton and Titans cricketers AB de Villiers, Heino Kuhn and Faf du Plessis.

Accolades
In 2008 he was inducted into the University of Pretoria Sport Hall of fame.

References

External links
Wynand Olivier on bluebulls.co.za
Wynand Olivier on bluebulls.co.za (Blue Bulls)
itsrugby.co.uk profile

1983 births
Living people
Afrikaner people
Black Rams Tokyo players
Blue Bulls players
Bulls (rugby union) players
Expatriate rugby union players in France
Expatriate rugby union players in Japan
Montpellier Hérault Rugby players
Rugby union centres
Rugby union players from Welkom
South Africa international rugby union players
South African expatriate rugby union players
South African expatriate sportspeople in France
South African expatriate sportspeople in Japan
South African rugby union players
University of Pretoria alumni